Focus are a Dutch progressive rock band from Amsterdam. Formed in November 1969, the group originally included keyboardist, flautist and vocalist Thijs van Leer, guitarist Jan Akkerman, bassist Martijn Dresden and drummer Hans Cleuver. The group broke up in 1978, but later reformed with various personnel changes in 1985, 1997 and finally 2002. The current lineup includes van Leer, drummer Pierre van der Linden (originally a member from 1971 to 1973, again from 1975 to 1976, and most recently since 2004), guitarist Menno Gootjes (originally from 1997 to 1998, and since 2010), and bassist Udo Pannekeet (since 2016).

History

1969–1978
Thijs van Leer, Jan Akkerman, Martijn Dresden and Hans Cleuver originally formed Focus in November 1969. Shortly after the release of the band's debut album Focus Plays Focus, Dresden and Cleuver were replaced by Cyril Havermans and Pierre van der Linden, respectively, both of whom had previously worked with Akkerman as members of Brainbox. The new members debuted on the follow-up Focus II, before Havermans was replaced by Bert Ruiter in September 1971. The lineup remained stable for Focus 3, before van der Linden left in October 1973 due to musical differences with van Leer and Akkerman. He was replaced by Colin Allen, and Focus released their fourth album Hamburger Concerto in 1974. Allen was later fired after recording just one track for the follow-up album.

Released in 1975, Mother Focus featured drums recorded by session musician David Kemper. van der Linden subsequently returned, although by early 1976 he had departed again and Kemper had taken his place on tour. The tour in question also featured new guitarist Philip Catherine, who joined on short notice after Akkerman suddenly left in February due to increasing tensions with van Leer. By mid-1977, the group's lineup had changed drastically – P. J. Proby took over lead vocal duties, Eef Albers joined as a second guitarist, and Steve Smith replaced Kemper on drums. Focus con Proby was released in 1978; the band never performed live with Proby, returning to tour the following year with new drummer Richard James. After the tour concluded in August 1978, the group disbanded.

1985 onwards
In 1984, van Leer and Akkerman reunited for a set of recordings under their own names, which were released the following March as Focus. The newly reformed group was intended to tour in promotion of the release, but disbanded again shortly after the album's release due to continued tensions between the two. Five years later, the pair reunited with former members Bert Ruiter and Pierre van der Linden for a performance of new and old material on a television special in the Netherlands, although it did not evolve into a full reformation. van Leer and Akkerman subsequently performed together again at the North Sea Jazz Festival in 1993, before van Leer attempted another short-lived Focus reformation with Ruiter, original drummer Hans Cleuver and new guitarist Menno Gootjes in 1997.

2002 onwards
In early 2002, Thijs van Leer reformed Focus again with new guitarist Jan Dumée, bassist Bobby Jacobs and drummer Ruben van Roon. Bert Smaak replaced van Roon shortly after the reformation to complete work on the comeback album Focus 8, and remained until August 2004 when van der Linden returned to the band. Dumée was replaced by Niels van der Steenhoven in time for Focus 9 / New Skin in 2006, before Gootjes returned for a second stint in 2010. After the band released Focus X and Golden Oldies, Udo Pannekeet replaced long-time bassist Jacobs in December 2016. The Focus Family Album and Focus 11 followed in 2017 and 2018, respectively.

Former bassist Bert Ruiter died on 24 March 2022, aged 75.

Members

Current

Former

Timeline

Lineups

References

External links
Focus official website

Focus